Warning is a 2021 science fiction thriller film directed by Agata Alexander in her directorial debut, from a screenplay by Alexander, Jason Kaye and Rob Michaelson. It stars Alex Pettyfer, Alice Eve, Annabelle Wallis, Benedict Samuel, Charlotte Le Bon, Thomas Jane, Patrick Schwarzenegger, Rupert Everett, Tomasz Kot, Kylie Bunbury and Garance Marillier. The film premiered at the 2021 Sitges Film Festival.

Synopsis
"Set in the not-too-distant future, this intense sci-fi thriller explores the repercussions that humanity faces when omniscient technology becomes a substitute for human contact. But life begins to unravel when a meteor shower and a global storm causes electronics to go haywire, leading to terrifying, deadly consequences."

Cast
 Alex Pettyfer as Liam
 Alice Eve as Claire
 Annabel Mullion as Dora
 Annabelle Wallis as Nina
 Benedict Samuel as Vincent
 Charlotte Le Bon as Charlotte
 Garance Marillier as Magda
 Kylie Bunbury as Anna
 Patrick Schwarzenegger as Ben
 Rupert Everett as Charlie
 Thomas Jane as David
 Tomasz Kot as Brian
 Toni Garrn as Olivia
 Richard Pettyfer as Ron
 James D’Arcy as the voice of God

Production
In September 2018, it was announced James D'Arcy, Laura Harrier, Mena Massoud, Alex Pettyfer, Charlotte Le Bon, Lana Condor and Benedict Samuel would star in the film, with Agata Alexander directing from a screenplay by herself, Jason Kaye and Rob Michaelson. Cybill Lui will produce under her Anova Pictures banner. In October 2018, Alice Eve joined the cast of the film. In November 2018, Annabelle Wallis joined the cast of the film. In February 2019, Raúl Castillo and Thomas Jane joined the cast of the film. In March 2019, it was announced Patrick Schwarzenegger, Rupert Everett, Tomasz Kot, Kylie Bunbury and Garance Marillier had joined the cast of the film. In April 2019, Toni Garrn, Annabel Mullion and Richard Pettyfer joined the cast of the film.

Principal photography began on March 13, 2019.

Reception

Critical response
On review aggregator Rotten Tomatoes, Warning holds an approval rating of 30% based on 10 reviews, with an average rating of 4.8/10." On Metacritic, the film holds a score of 53 out of 100, based on 5 critics, indicating "mixed or average reviews".

References

External links
 
 

2021 films
American science fiction thriller films
Polish science fiction thriller films
2021 directorial debut films
2021 science fiction films
2021 thriller films
2020s English-language films
2020s science fiction thriller films
2020s American films